Simon Girty (November 14, 1741 – February 18, 1818) was an American-born frontiersman, soldier and interpreter from Harrisburg, Pennsylvania, who served as a liaison between the British and their Indian allies during the American Revolution. He was portrayed as a villain, and was also featured this way in 19th and early 20th-century fiction from the United States. As children, Girty and his brothers were taken captive in Pennsylvania in a Seneca raid and adopted. He lived with the Seneca for seven years and became fully assimilated, preferring their culture. He was returned to his birth family but retained a sympathy for the Indians.

Early life
Simon Girty was born to Simon Girty the Elder and Mary Newton near Harrisburg, Pennsylvania. Simon Girty the Elder arrived in North America in 1730 from Ireland. The accepted spelling of Girty's name was most likely a "colonial derivation of McGearty, Gearty, Garrity, Garrarghty, Geraghty or Girtee" and a corruption and Anglicization of an older native Irish surname Mag Oireachtach. After establishing a trading post, Simon Girty the Elder and Mary Newton had four sons: Thomas, Simon, James, and George, in 1739–1746. In May 1750, the Sheriff arrested the entire Girty family, along with other squatters, for building a home on Sherman's Creek on the Susquehanna River, before the colonial authorities allowed any settlers to build there. The colonial authorities—specifically, George Croghan—also burned down the Girty home, shed, barn, and corral. All squatters were forced to post bonds of £500 each, and were bound for trial at Cumberland County, Pennsylvania Court.

Simon Girty's father killed
In December 1750, Simon Girty the Elder and Samuel Sanders (or Saunders) fought, or dueled, which ended with Girty's death. After both men fired a shot and missed, they pulled out their swords. "Girty made a misstep and fell. Sanders treacherously ran him through with his sword, which caused his death". Saunders was either a "convict, an escaped bond servant, a soldier, or a rival trader who competed with Girty and murdered him to steal his trade goods". Samuel Saunders was subsequently arrested, tried in Philadelphia, convicted of manslaughter, and imprisoned.

One source says that Simon Girty the Elder's head was split with a tomahawk by an Indian called "The Fish", and that John Turner, his half-brother, avenged Girty by killing "The Fish".

Thomas McKee and George Gibson applied for Simon Girty the Elder's estate (his house and land) and persuaded William Plumsted, the mayor of Philadelphia, to backdate their application by a full year to make it appear legal. McKee claimed Girty owed him £300 for trade goods he sold to Girty on credit. Plumsted went along with Gibson and McKee's scheme, and McKee was subsequently awarded Girty's estate.

Three years after Simon Girty the Elder was killed, his wife Mary married John Turner, his half-brother (and in some versions of the story, her husband's avenger). They settled near to the land once owned by Simon Girty the Elder.

In 1754, John Turner Jr. was born.

During the French and Indian War (1754–1763), the area where they had their farm became too dangerous, with numerous war parties attacking settlers, so John Turner took his new family to Fort Granville on the Juniata River in western Pennsylvania, along with dozens of other English families looking for safety. At Fort Granville, John Turner joined the local militia under Captain Edward Ward and was promoted to Sergeant, Ward's third in command.

On August 2, 1756, Captain Ward had taken the majority of the militia out on patrol, which was known to the local Lenape tribe. Captain François Coulon de Villiers attacked Fort Granville with 55 French soldiers and about 100 Lenape Indians. Villiers' force snuck along Juniata River and set the stockade on fire. This made a large hole, through which they killed an officer and an enlisted man and wounded several men who were fighting the fire. Villiers then offered quarter if the fort surrendered, so John Turner, as the ranking living officer, opened the gate. After marching the prisoners away from the fort, the French and Lenape plundered the fort and burned it to the ground. The Lenape then took the prisoners to Kittanning, their village on the Allegheny River.

Torture and death of John Turner
The Lenape had previously traded with Simon Girty the Elder, and they recognized his wife and children. One tradition says the Lenape sincerely believed that John Turner was the man who had killed Simon Girty the Elder in order to take his house, land, and family. Other traditions say that the Lenape recognized him as Girty's avenger and killer of "The Fish", or that they thought that John Turner had badly beaten an Indian. For whichever reason, Chief Jacobs (Toweah) of the Lenape and his council condemned John Turner to be burned at the stake. The Muncey Lenape pushed red-hot gun barrels into and through John Turner's body. John Turner endured three hours of ritualistic torture before he was scalped, and a young Lenape struck a tomahawk into his brain, killing him, all in front of his wife, stepchildren, and newborn baby.

Thomas Girty escaped his Lenape captivity during the British-led Kittanning Expedition on September 8, 1756, although Simon, his mother and his other brothers remained in captivity. 

After the Kittanning Expedition, the Indians split the Girty family up; they were sent to live with different tribes. Thirteen-year-old James Girty was taken by Shawnee warriors, as were Mary and baby John Turner. The Lenape kept 10-year-old George Girty. Fifteen-year-old Simon Girty was given to Guyasuta, Chief of the Ohio Seneca (Mingoes), and lived in a village near Lake Erie's east shore in northwestern Pennsylvania.

Guyasuta

After he gained the respect of the Mingoes by running the gauntlet successfully, the Mingo pulled out all of Simon Girty's hair, leaving just a scalplock on his crown. Later, Simon was given "breechcoth and leggings, a deerskin shirt, and moccasins".  Simon Girty lived with Guyasuta for seven years. He was returned to the British in November 1764, during a prisoner exchange after the end of Pontiac's War.

During the period when Simon Girty lived with them (1756–1764), Guyasuta and the Ohio Seneca fought in many battles against the British in the French and Indian War. Guyasuta was instrumental in defeat of Major James Grant at the Battle of Fort Duquesne on September 14, 1758. The French and Indian War officially ended in 1763, but hostilities between the Indians and the British continued in Pontiac's War. Guyasuta and the Ohio Seneca were allied with Pontiac, and fought alongside his warriors at the July 1763 Siege of Fort Pitt, the July 31, 1763 Battle of Bloody Run, the August 5–6, 1763 Battle of Bushy Run, and the September 14, 1763 Devil's Hole Massacre (the deadliest engagement for the British during the war). It's unclear if Simon Girty fought along with Guyasuta in this war.

On October 17, 1764, British commander Henry Bouquet demanded that the Ohio Indians return all captives, including those not yet returned from the French and Indian War. Chief Guyasuta and other native leaders reluctantly handed over more than 200 captives, many of whom had been adopted into Indian families. On November 14, 1764, Simon Girty returned to the British after a prisoner exchange, and resurfaced near Fort Pitt. Simon Girty knew 11 languages, had become fully assimilated with the Seneca, and preferred their way of life.

Simon Girty was the principal interpreter at the signing of the Treaty of Fort Stanwix between the Iroquois and the British.

Role in American Revolution
During the American Revolution, Girty first sided with the colonial revolutionaries. He later served with the Loyalists and their Indian allies, including many Seneca and three other Iroquois nations. American rebel frontiersmen considered him a renegade and turncoat.

Lord Dunmore's War
Simon served alongside, with and for George Rogers Clark, Simon Kenton, Thomas and Edward Cunningham (Rangers), Daniel Boone (Ranger), Colonel William Crawford, Daniel Morgan and William Caldwell, fighting for the British during Lord Dunmore's War. Simon served in the capacity of a spy, scout and intermediary for Lord Dunmore with the Shawnees. The war began with the Yellow Creek Massacre on April 30, 1774, when Virginia frontiersmen led by Daniel Greathouse killed the family of Mingo war-leader Johnny Logan, who had been friendly to Americans.

The Indians were defeated at the Battle of Point Pleasant. After Chief Cornstalk signed the Treaty of Camp Charlotte, Dunmore sent Girty to bring Johnny Logan to the capitulation proceedings. Simon found Logan, but Logan wouldn't come. He told Girty his thoughts and feelings regarding the entire ordeal in Logan's Lament, which Girty repeated to the British officers. At the conclusion of the war, Simon was a commissioned Lieutenant in the Virginia Militia. This unit was disbanded the following year.

Simon Girty was among the early Virginia Frontiersmen to draft up the Original First Declaration of Independence. They had just returned from a successful campaign under Lord Dunmore and discovered the passage of the Intolerable Acts. This meant they could find themselves under orders to stop an uprising of their own countrymen. If they were to raise any objection, this could be seen as treason.
 
Instead of keeping quiet, they took matters into their own hands, and many settled amid the great danger west of the Alleghenies in open defiance of the Royal Proclamation of 1763. Among their number were many famous as intrepid frontiersmen and others who were soon to gain fame as officers in the Revolution: Simon Kenton, the notorious Simon Girty, Michael Cresap, Colonel William Crawford, George Rogers Clark, Adam Stephen and Daniel Morgan. These men were not easily intimidated.

Squaw Campaign
During the American Revolution, Girty initially served with American forces against Indian allies of the British.

In early 1778, the Americans sent an expedition to destroy Indian stores and supplies along the Cuyahoga River in northeastern Ohio. The force of 500 American volunteers was led by General Edward Hand, Colonel William Crawford (a land speculator and close friend of George Washington), and Colonel Providence Mounts, and included Girty.

They set out on February 8, 1778. They marched out of Fort Pitt, crossed the Allegheny River, and went 22 miles down the Ohio River over the ancient Indian trails called the "Great Path", to the mouth of the Beaver River.

One morning Major James Brenton asked Simon to help him find his horse. After finding the horse, Brenton and Simon were returning to camp, when they heard gunfire near the forks of the Beaver River (the confluence of the Mahoning and Shenango). The Americans had come across Kuskusky, an old, nearly abandoned Lenape village, and attacked before inquiring about who was residing there. An old man, who was digging up stored corn behind his house, shot one round from his musket at the Americans, wounding Captain David Scott and breaking his arm. Rezin Virgin (1750 - 1825) killed the old man with his tomahawk. A woman ran out of the cabin with her hands up, and she leaned against a tree. Several American volunteers "ran up, fell upon, shot and killed her". Another woman and a group of children ran from a cabin and disappeared into the woods. An old Indian woman came out of a cabin with her hands up, and the Americans fired many shots at her, only being able to shoot one of her fingers off, before Hand and Crawford ordered the troops to cease firing.

The old woman confirmed that the old man that they had shot was her husband, Bull. Bull's brother was Hopocan ("Captain Pipe"), the principal Lenape chief. The dead woman was Captain Pipe's mother. The old woman also mentioned that there were 10 Muncie warriors at a nearby saltlick 10 miles up the Mahoning River (at present day Niles, Ohio). General Hand sent Simon Girty and a dozen American volunteers to scout for these warriors, but they only found five Lenape women (one of whom they kept as a hostage), and a young Indian boy. The Lenape boy, who was hunting birds in a tree by himself with a bow and arrow, was killed. Americans Zach Connell and Squire Forman argued over who got the boy's scalp

On March 3, Hand returned to Fort Pitt with "a few Indian muskets, pots and pans, two Indian women captives, and a pair of scalps". George Morgan apologized to the Lenapes, who at the time were neutral.

Defection

Simon Girty talked to Simon Kenton the night before he defected.

In early 1778, when Edward Hand was the Commander of Fort Pitt, Simon Girty discovered the North-Western tribes were uniting against the Americans. This would involve the entire frontier and this was the turning point that would allow the seductive promises of Elliot and McKee to succeed in turning Simon. On March 28, 1778, Alexander McKee (Scots-Irish Loyalist), Matthew Elliott, and Simon Girty all defected on the same night. Along with them was Robert Surphlit (McKee's cousin), a man named Higgins (an employee), and two of McKee's black slaves. Seven men left McKee's house in Pittsburgh, and absconded west into the Ohio country, and towards the British stronghold in Detroit. A few hours later, a party of American soldiers arrived at the house to take McKee to the Pittsburgh prison.

The seven defectors stopped by Coshocton, the capital of the Lenape. After the murders of Captain Pipe's mother and brother, the Lenape's loyalties were split. Captain Pipe wanted war on the Americans, and White Eyes wanted peace. Simon Girty made a pledge for war, and the Lenape agreed.

While in Coshocton, Simon met his brother James Girty, who joined Simon in his defection. George Girty eventually followed in his brothers' footsteps, and also defected. A Pennsylvania court declared Simon, James, and George Girty, along with Alexander McKee and Matthew Elliot, to be outlaws, guilty of treason, and placed an $800 bounty on Simon Girty's head.

On April 20, 1778, Simon Girty, along with Edward Hazel, a British Indian agent, and Leatherlips, a Wyandot chief, reached Detroit, where Henry Hamilton employed Simon at sixteen shillings a day.

On October 1, 1779, Girty and Alexander McKee, leading a large force of Indians, ambushed American forces in present-day Northern Kentucky. The Americans were returning from an expedition to New Orleans. The ambush occurred near Dayton, Kentucky, across the Ohio River from Cincinnati, Ohio. Only a handful of the Americans survived, among them Colonel John Campbell and Captain Robert Benham.

In August 1782, Simon Girty, under the command at William Caldwell, along with about 300 Shawnee natives and British Canadians, attacked Bryan Station. Three days later, they ambushed Daniel Boone at the Battle of Blue Licks.

Girty is credited with saving the lives of many American prisoners of the Indians during the war, often by buying their freedom at his own expense.

Role in Northwest Indian War
Simon was hired by George Morgan who was serving as the Patriot Commissioner of Indian Affairs Middle District. Simon was to serve as an interpreter and intermediary to the Six Nations. It was Simon that negotiated the first treaty with the Indians. He was sent to represent the United American States and addressed the Grand Council of the Iroquois League at Onondaga, New York. He successfully returned to Pittsburgh. Words were exchanged and Simon was fired.

During the Northwest Indian War (1785–1795), Girty fought alongside the Wyandots and other Indians. He fought the Americans at St. Clair's Defeat in 1791, the greatest defeat the United States Army has ever known.

Resettlement in Upper Canada
After the end of the war, Simon Girty settled in Upper Canada (now Ontario) along with other Loyalists and Indian allies of the British, such as nations of the Iroquois Confederacy. They were granted land by the British Crown in recognition of their service during the war. He retired to his farm near Fort Malden (present-day Amherstburg, Ontario) prior to the outbreak of the War of 1812. Girty's son was killed in that conflict, reportedly while trying to rescue a wounded British officer from the battlefield.

Despite popular myths to the contrary, Simon Girty had no part in that war, except as a refugee when the British retreated from Fort Malden; nor was he killed with Tecumseh at the Battle of the Thames, as was widely reported. Then more than sixty years old, he was increasingly infirm with arthritis and failing eyesight. Girty returned to his farm in Canada after the war and died in 1818, completely blind.

Representation in culture

Simon Girty, the Outlaw. An Historical Romance (1846), was a novel by Uriah James Jones portraying him as a renegade.
 Simon Girty: "The White Savage" A Romance of the Border (1880) was a novel by Charles McKnight.
 Simon Girty is a pivotal figure, objectively represented in the Allan Eckert historical novel The Frontiersmen.
 Simon Girty, along with his brothers, is vilified in Zane Grey's frontier trilogy series, Betty Zane, The Spirit of the Border and The Last Trail.
 Joseph Altsheler features Simon Girty as a turncoat and villain in several of his "Young Trailer Series" of eight juvenile fiction books, published from 1907–1911.
Girty is played by John Carradine in the 1936 film Daniel Boone.
 Simon Girty was featured as one of the jury members in Stephen Vincent Benet's short story "The Devil and Daniel Webster" and in the 1941 movie of the same title. In that story, he is described as "the renegade, who saw white men burned at the stake and whooped with the Indians to see them burn".
 Simon Girty is played by Kem Dibbs and portrayed as a French/Cherokee renegade, working with a fictional Shawnee chief against Daniel Boone in the 1956 film Daniel Boone, Trailblazer.
 Hugh Henry Brackenridge edited the detailed recollections of a witness to Crawford's execution. Published as Dr. Knight's Narrative, this account influenced Girty's reputation as a renegade. 20th-century historians have researched the account and questioned the bias of Brackenridge in his version.
 Simon Girty is featured as a character in Julius de Gruyter's novel Drum Beats on the Sandusky (1969). This novel portrays one of Crawford's young volunteer soldiers' reprieve from Indian capture and his subsequent adventures in Girty's custody.
 Canadian playwright Ed Butts wrote a play entitled, The Fame of Simon Girty.
 Girty: Historical Fiction in Prose and Poetry, by Richard Taylor.
 Girty appears as a character in the fictional novel The Dakota Cipher by William Dietrich.
 At the beginning of Episode 12, Season 2, airing December 12, 1966, "The Night of the Man Eating House", of the CBS TV show The Wild Wild West, the title character, James West (Robert Conrad), mentions Girty, along with Benedict Arnold as he describes the escaped prisoner he, his partner Artemus Gordon (Ross Martin) and the Sheriff (William Talman) have been assigned to return to prison: Liston Day (Hurd Hatfield). Thirty years earlier, in the Anglos' struggle with the Mexicans for Texas, Day was charged with and convicted of being a renegade and a traitor, guilty of the deaths of many Americans—like Girty. Like Girty, Day grows old and feeble—at least by the beginning of the episode.
 He is featured as an ambiguous renegade character in Hugo Pratt's graphic novel Fort Wheeling (1962).
Girty is featured in the Deerfoot novels by Edward S. Ellis.
He is the main character in Indian Lover by Lewis Owen.
He is the main character in the graphic novel, Wilderness: The True Story of Simon Girty, The Renegade by Timothy Truman, published from 1989–1990.
His choosing to fight on the side of the Native Americans is the inspiration for the 2002 song "Simon Girty's Decision" by Todd Tamanend Clark. 
He is mentioned in Flood Tides Along the Allegheny.
Simon Girty is the main antagonist/central character of historical drama The White Savage at Trumpet in the Land in New Philadelphia, Ohio.
Simon Girty the historical figure is portrayed as clever yet sadistic in Harlan Hatcher's book Lake Erie.
Girty appears in Ann Finlayson's historical young adult novel Greenhorn on the Frontier

Notes

References

Further reading

Butts, Edward. Simon Girty: Wilderness Warrior. Canada: Dundurn, 2011.

Leighton, Douglas. "Simon Girty". Dictionary of Canadian Biography Online, 1983.

 

1741 births
1818 deaths
People from Franklin County, Pennsylvania
American people of Irish descent
British Indian Department
Loyalist military personnel of the American Revolutionary War
People from Amherstburg, Ontario
Pre-Confederation Ontario people
American people of the Northwest Indian War
Loyalists in the American Revolution from Pennsylvania
People of colonial Pennsylvania
Captives of Native Americans